The Brutal Boxer is a 1972 Hong Kong film.

Cast
Jackie Chan
Chan Sing
Tien Ni
Raymond Lui Sing Kung
Mars
Wilson Tong 
Guan Shan
Alan Tang Kong Wing
Got Heung Ting
Corey Yuen

References

1972 films
Hong Kong action films
1970s action films
1970s Mandarin-language films
1970s Hong Kong films